Paula Peralejo (born June 29, 1984) is the stage name of Maria Elena Paula Bautista Peralejo-Fernandez, a former Filipino actress. She is the younger sister of actress Rica Peralejo.

TV career
Peralejo was among the cast of ABS-CBN's Ang TV

In 1995, she made her film debut as Jessie in Star Cinema's Sarah... Ang Munting Prinsesa.

In most of her teen years, she was paired with Patrick Garcia.

In 1997, Peralejo was relaunched as a teen actress via ABS-CBN's Talent Center's, now Star Magic, Star Circle Batch 4 and joined the cast of Gimik in the same year. She portrayed the role of Joie in the hit teleserye Mula sa Puso.

When Gimik ended, she was cast as Anne in Tabing Ilog in 1999.

Personal life
Peralejo completed her Bachelor of Science in Philosophy, with a Tourism minor, in the University of the Philippines. She graduated on April 26, 2008, as magna cum laude.

On February 23, 2013, Peralejo married Charlie Fernandez in Filipiniana-themed wedding in Pinaglabanan Shrine (Sanctuario de Santo Cristo) in San Juan.

Peralejo is currently the general manager of her travel agency business Our Restless Feet Travel and Tours.

Filmography

Television

Film

References

External links
 

1984 births
Filipino child actresses
Living people
Star Magic
Filipino film actresses
Filipino women comedians
ABS-CBN personalities
University of the Philippines Diliman alumni